The Copa Centenario Revolución de Mayo was an international football tournament, held in Argentina from 29 May to 12 June 1910, and organized by the Argentine Football Association. It was the first international tournament in South America where more than two football nations participated. The "Copa Centenario" is considered a predecessor to the South American Championship, later renamed "Copa América". 

This contest was held in honor of the 100th anniversary of the May Revolution. Previous to that, the only international competitions in South America had been contested by the national teams of Uruguay and Argentina only. Those competitions included Copa Newton, Copa Lipton, Copa Premier Honor Argentino, and Copa Premier Honor Uruguayo.

Because of having featured three of the subsequent four founding members of CONMEBOL, the Copa Centenario Revolución de Mayo was sometimes called "the first Copa América". However, CONMEBOL recognizes the 1916 South American Championship as the first edition of the competition.

The tournament was contested in a round-robin format between the national teams of Argentina, Chile and Uruguay. All three games were played in Buenos Aires, the first in Club Colegiales Stadium  and the rest in Gimnasia y Esgrima Stadium.

Squads
For a complete list of participating squads see: Copa Centenario Revolución de Mayo squads

Standings

Matches

Goalscorers

See also
 Copa América
 Argentina Centennial

Notes

References

Argentine football friendly trophies
Uruguayan football friendly trophies
1910 in South American football
International association football competitions hosted by Argentina
1910 in Argentine football
1910 in Uruguayan football
Football in Buenos Aires
May 1910 sports events
June 1910 sports events
Sports competitions in Buenos Aires
1910s in Buenos Aires